Gilman & Gonzalez-Falla Theatre Foundation give awards to new songwriters and book writers. The foundation was created by American Theatre Wing Board Member, Sondra Gilman, and Texas Art Commissioner, Celso Gonzalez-Falla. The Musical Theatre Award is accompanied by a grant of $25,000. A number of smaller grants (between $1,000- $5,000) are also awarded at the ceremony. To qualify the "writers must have had at least one musical produced in either a commercial or a professional non-profit theatre in America."

Previous Musical Theatre Award winners

Other Winners
Michael John LaChiusa
Robert Lindsay Nassif
Andrew Lippa

Grants
The Foundation also gives out commendations of $1000–$5000. Previous winners include:
Kirsten Childs
Martin Sylvestri
Joel Higgins
John Bucchino
David Evans
Bill Russell (lyricist)
Lynn Ahrens
Stephen Flaherty
Jonathan Larson

References

American theater awards